Wayra Q'asa (Quechua wayra wind, q'asa mountain pass, "wind pass", Hispanicized spelling Huayraccasa) is a mountain in the Andes of Peru, about  high. It is situated in the Huancavelica Region, Angaraes Province, Lircay District.

References

Mountains of Huancavelica Region
Mountains of Peru